In philately, stamp hinges, or mounts, are small, folded, transparent, rectangular pieces of paper coated with a mild gum. They are used by stamp collectors to affix postage stamps onto the pages of a stamp album.

Use 
The short end is moistened and affixed to the stamp, the long end is likewise affixed to the page. The hinge keeps the stamp on the page while still allowing it to be lifted to examine the back, for instance to see the watermark or expert marks.

Abbreviation 
Collectors categorise their stamps as follows:
 MUH/MNH - Mint Unhinged/Never Hinged
 H - Hinged
 LH - Lightly Hinged
 HH - Heavily Hinged
 HR - Hinge Remnant (portion of the hinge could not be removed and remains on the stamp)

Risks 
The best stamp hinges are designed to be “peelable”, meaning that the stamp may be removed from the page, and the hinge from the stamp, without damage to either. Not all makes of hinge have this property, and the backs of many stamps have “hinge remnants”, where the hinge has torn away rather than releasing the stamp. This is especially common for mint stamps, where the stamp’s own gum adheres tightly to the hinge. Some old stamps may actually have multiple hinge remnants layered on top of each other. Conversely, careless removal of a hinge may take away a layer of the stamp’s paper, resulting in a type of stamp thin known as a hinge thin. The thinner paper will be noticeable when the stamp is held up to the light and is considered a serious fault in a stamp.

Even with the use of peelable hinges and care to minimize the moisture used, the hinge will leave a visible disturbance in the gum of an unused stamp. While this was formerly a matter of indifference, since about the middle of the 20th century many collectors have come to prefer “unhinged stamps” showing no trace of hinging.

Collectors preferring unhinged stamps typically use pocket-like or sleeve-like hingeless mounts, often for higher-value or unused stamps. Nevertheless, stamp hinges remain popular as a mounting method.

Re-gumming 

Since the time that unhinged stamps became popular, considerable numbers of old stamps with intact gum have appeared on the market, raising suspicion that many of these have been regummed.

References 

Hinge
Philatelic terminology